Helsby is a village, civil parish and electoral ward in the unitary authority of Cheshire West and Chester and the ceremonial county of Cheshire, England.

In the 2001 census the civil parish of Helsby had a population of 4,701.  By the 2011 census this had risen to 4,972.

Geography

The village is situated on the A56 main road between Chester and Runcorn. The neighbouring settlements are Dunham-on-the-Hill, Frodsham, Elton and Alvanley. Helsby is a semi-rural village, with many dairy and arable farms, but is also in close proximity to a number of industrial plants around the Mersey estuary including the Essar Stanlow Oil Refinery, the Encirc glass bottle manufacturing plant, the Kemira fertiliser plant on Ince Marshes and the Ineos Chlor chemical manufacturing site and power station at Rocksavage. There are few jobs in Helsby itself, due to the larger surrounding cities of Chester and Runcorn offering better prospects and a wider range of careers. The Tesco supermarket is one of the biggest employers in Helsby. The village is popular with commuters as a residential area, due to its links to the M56 motorway and rail networks.

History
On Helsby Hill, the remains of a promontory hillfort, 1.9ha in area, have been excavated. A buried soil was found under the hillfort containing fossilised pollen dating to the late Mesolithic to early Neolithic, between 7000 and 3001BC. Further evidence suggests a burning episode dating to the early Neolithic occupation or woodland clearance dating to 4000BC to 2351 BC.

The bivallate hillfort is protected on the south and east by two parallel ramparts and an unusual type of inturned entrance 11 yards (10 m) wide. There were three phases of hillfort construction at Helsby. The first stone rampart was constructed in the middle to late Bronze Age (1250-1050 cal BC) and consisted of a bank of well dressed, outer face of sandstone blocks and an irregular inner face, which was built on a slight batter; it was approximately 4 yards (3.5m) wide. A socketed bronze axe found at Helsby in 1925. This was followed by a series of colluvial deposits against the internal face of the stone rampart that formed the second phase of activity. The third and final phase was the re-building of the rampart in the post-Roman period, dating as late as 530 AD suggesting early Saxon re-occupation of the hillfort.

Helsby was located on the strategically important Roman road between Chester and Wilderspool near Warrington. The road existed between c. 79–410 AD to link the garrison of Deva to Wilderspool, which produced pottery that supplied the north west of England. The Roman road passed at the foot of Helsby Hill probably following the route of Old Chester Road. On the top of the hill a Roman bronze sestertius of the emperor Tiberius minted in Rome in AD22 was found and just off Vicarage Lane in 1958, an uninscribed Roman altar of red sandstone was discovered with a carved jug on one side and an axe and knife on the other.

The first known settlers of Helsby were the Vikings in the 10th century. In fact, the name 'Helsby' is likely to be derived from the Viking name Hjallr-by, meaning "the village on the edge" (placenames with the suffix "by" often denote Viking/Danish origins, e.g. Derby, Grimsby, Whitby, etc.). However, Old Norse suggests that Hjalli means edge and Hjallr means constructed platform or scaffold.

The village was recorded in the Domesday Book of 1086 under the Norman name of Hellesbe. The Manor of Helsby was owned by a series of aristocratic landowners, most recently the Marquess of Cholmondeley.

In the 13th century Helsby was deemed a demesne manor under the lordship of Dunham-on-the-Hill, by a family called Hellesby. Later it passed to Thornton and then to Frodsham. The earliest mention of the original, timber Old Hall, was in a contract for the construction of additional work in stone in the mid 15th century. The wooden part of the hall perished in a fire in the 16th century when it was leased to one of the Hatons of Helsby. The later hall probably derived its name from its proximity to the older site. It was built of brick at the end of the 18th century and was used as a farmhouse.

Helsby Hill was the location of a rare public execution when William Henry Clarke was hung in chains on 21 April 1791 after being convicted of robbing the Warrington Mail.

In 1968, Mudiad Amddiffyn Cymru (Welsh Defence Movement), a Welsh republican movement, blew up a water pipe at Hapsford near Helsby. The water pipe was carrying water from Chester to Liverpool.

Community
A Methodist church was established in 1800, seventy years before the Anglican church was built in 1870. Helsby is home to two primary schools (Helsby Hillside and Hornsmill) that serve the east and west of the village respectively, with the former being in close proximity to one of the most successful secondary schools in Cheshire for the 2018/2019 academic year: Helsby High School.

The village was once home to many pubs, the majority of which were adjacent to the A56 road. In the centre of the village, the Railway Inn currently offers Greenalls cask ale and is frequently host to live music; it recently changed licensee and a refurbishment is rumoured for January 2018. The old Helsby train station waiting rooms houses the very popular Beer Heroes craft ale Tap Room which provides a vast library of craft ales to buy and take away, as well as beers on draft.

Two other pubs, the Robin Hood and the Horse & Jockey, were acquired by developers for conversion to residential properties. On 23 September 2011, the Robin Hood pub caught fire, causing roads to be closed throughout the village for some hours, and subsequently the building(s) were demolished. The Horse & Jockey was demolished in 2019 and a housing development has been built. The pub sign is to be displayed in the local community centre.

On the western edge of the village is the Horns Mill (formerly the Helsby Arms and before that the Brown Cow), a pub and restaurant that has changed hands on several occasions during recent years, and also closed down briefly, but reopened in January 2014.

The village has been in the press for its hugely successful community Christmas event, Ho Ho Helsby, which was held for the second time on 2 December 2017. There was an estimated attendance of 2,500 people enjoying artisan stalls, ice skating, reindeer, live music from local musicians on stage all day and a twilight procession of floats featuring local schools, community groups and businesses. The village is known for its community spirit, epitomised in the fund raising efforts for Ho Ho Helsby which is entirely voluntary, as well as knitted angels which are hidden around the village in the run up to Christmas Day. The village also has its own craft beer, Ho Ho Helsbeer, brewed in a brewery less than two miles away.

Behind the Railway Inn is the Courtyard, Helsby, a development of holiday cottages in period barn conversions offering a place to stay in the village, close to the North Cheshire Way footpath. There is also "Homestead Boutique Cottages" offering accommodation on Lower Robin Hood Lane.

Transport

Railway services
The railway came to Helsby in 1850, with the construction of the line between Chester and Warrington. Helsby railway station has won awards as one of the best kept unmanned stations in the UK. The signal box at Helsby Junction is still operated manually. Services are operated at approximately hourly intervals by Transport for Wales to Manchester Piccadilly and in the other direction to Chester and Llandudno. There is also an occasional Transport For Wales service connecting Helsby from Chester to Liverpool Lime Street during the day and early evening as of 2021. The village had another railway station, Helsby and Alvanley railway station, which is closed.

There is also a minimal (Parliamentary) service operated by Northern to neighbouring Ince & Elton and Stanlow & Thornton with trains terminating at Ellesmere Port where a connection is made with the Merseyrail electric service to Liverpool.

Bus services
There are frequent bus links: X30 (Warrington to Chester), and X2 (Runcorn to Ellesmere Port). All these run Monday to Saturday only.

Industry and economy
The factory site at the western end of the village has for many years been the main source of employment in the village. Originally built in 1884 by the Telegraph Manufacturing Company as the Britannia Telegraph Works, it manufactured telegraph and telephone cables. Early advertisements for cable hands specified that he "must be a good cricketer"! The company was taken over by the Automatic Telephone Manufacturing  Company and the telephone equipment and instrument  manufacturing sections moved to Liverpool in 1892. The cable works was more recently owned by BICC to make electronic cables. At peak employing 5,000 people, the number of workers declined from the Second World War. The decline continued following a series of redundancy initiatives started in 1970, and the site eventually closed in 2002. The site was then redeveloped for retail, light industrial and residential purposes. The first completed development on the site was a Tesco supermarket, which opened in September 2005.  In 2005 cable manufacturing returned to Helsby when Heat Trace Limited, a British specialist cable manufacturer, took over one of the last remaining industrial buildings on the site to expand their operations, taking advantage of the existence of the electron beaming unit on the site for the irradiation of their specialist heating cables.

North west of Helsby, near the village of Ince, landowners The Peel Group are developing a  industrial site on marshland. In 2009 a public inquiry gave permission to build a biomass power station, which opened in 2018  as part of the Protos "energy and resource hub".  The site also houses a timber recycling plant and designated "nature areas".   
The construction of a facility to recover energy from non-recyclable waste began in 2020.

Landmarks

Helsby Hill

Helsby Hill has steep cliffs on the northern and western sides and is a prominent landmark rising above the Cheshire Plain and overlooking the Mersey estuary. Much of the hill is owned and managed by the National Trust. It is the site of Helsby hill fort, an ancient British hillfort, and more recently acquired a concrete pillar trig point on its summit. The top of the hill also has a former Royal Observer Corps post, which was abandoned in 1992. Visitors who see Helsby Hill from the M56 or on the train can sometimes see a man's face within the cliff face from east, west and sometimes from the north. This is referred to as the "Old Man of Helsby".

Access to hill
Numerous footpaths, running from the public roads encircling the hill, give ready access for walkers. One such path, known as Hill Road, runs through a large sandstone cutting, which was the route of a railway in the Second World War. The hilltop offers views of the Welsh hills and, on exceptionally clear days, Snowdon. The landmarks of Liverpool can clearly be seen beyond the Helsby marshes, Stanlow Oil Refinery, the Kemira fertiliser plant and the Manchester Ship Canal. Also on very clear days, visitors can see across Lancashire, past Bolton, to Winter Hill; in mid-morning (when the sun is reflecting off it), it is often possible to see the large white section on top of the Winter Hill TV Mast. The view looking back is not as diverse, but the Peckforton Hills and Beeston Castle can be discerned.

During the particularly dry summer of 2018 a wild fire on top of the hill was visible for many miles. Mainly gorse and bracken the fire blazed over the cliff face and was contained after several hours.

Rock climbing
The craggy face of the hill provides many routes for rock climbers at a range of grades from easy climbs suitable for beginners (some of which do not require ropes), to challenging climbs up to a grade 6c. The cliff is also split into two lateral sections. The main face is easily accessible from the ground. At the top is a large grassy area, followed by an easily accessible 10-foot (or thereabouts) cliff to the summit, which is excellent for bouldering. Despite its often slimy appearance, the cliff's sandstone composition means it dries out quickly after rain, and, after several accidents, several large metal spikes were placed at the top of the main cliff for top-rope climbing that offer extra safety for climbers worried about the sandstone's crumbly nature. Two quarries in Harmers Wood, southwest of Helsby Hill, feature over sixty climbs of varying difficulty.

Mountskill Quarry

Sandstone was extracted from a working quarry from the early 19th century until the 1920s. Much of the stone was transported by ferry to Liverpool and Birkenhead, where several buildings, including the Customs House near Canning Dock, were built of Helsby stone. The quarry originally had its own dedicated horse-drawn tramway link to Ince Pier. After stone production ceased, it was not until the late 1980s that an alternative use was found for the site and in the intervening decades the derelict site was used as a tip by local residents. The site was acquired by the former Vale Royal Borough Council in 1988 and transformed into a woodland park, which was opened in 1990. 'Helsby Quarry Woodland Park' is now managed by Cheshire West and Chester Council. It contains a range of trees including oak, sycamore, rowan, silver birch, willow and beech—some of which grew naturally during the site's period of dereliction, and some of which were planted specifically in preparing the woodland park. The woodland and grassland are inhabited by many animal and bird species. Aside from the wildlife, the geology of the site is one of its most significant features and it is designated a Regionally Important Geological Site. The site features exposed rock walls and a tunnel, which enable sandstone formations from the Triassic period (251–199 million years ago) to be viewed.

Notable people 
 J. Slater Lewis MICE FRSE (1852 in Rake House, Helsby – 1901) a British engineer, inventor, business manager and early author on management and accounting, known for his pioneering work on cost accounting.
 Ted Oldfield (1918 in Helsby – 2006) an English footballer who played at right-half for Port Vale 
 Heathcote Williams (1941 in Helsby – 2017) an English poet, actor, political activist and dramatist

See also

St Paul's Church, Helsby
Listed buildings in Helsby

References

External links 

Helsby Parish Council
Cheshire West and Chester Council
Helsby High School
Viking Wirral
Helsby Methodist Church
Helsby Village Action Group
Helsby Football Club
Helsby Golf Club
Helsby Running Club
North Cheshire Rail Users Group

Villages in Cheshire
Civil parishes in Cheshire
National Trust properties in Cheshire